Bryan Steven Gómez Peñaloza (born 19 November 1994) is a Colombian professional racing cyclist, who currently rides for UCI Continental team . He rode in the men's team time trial at the 2015 UCI Road World Championships.

Major results
2019
 1st Stage 1 Tour de Taiwan
 1st Stage 10 Vuelta a Guatemala
 3rd  Road race, Pan American Games
2022
 8th Time trial, National Road Championships

References

External links
 

1994 births
Living people
Colombian male cyclists
Sportspeople from Valle del Cauca Department
Pan American Games medalists in cycling
Pan American Games silver medalists for Colombia
Pan American Games bronze medalists for Colombia
Cyclists at the 2019 Pan American Games
Medalists at the 2019 Pan American Games
21st-century Colombian people
Competitors at the 2018 South American Games
South American Games gold medalists for Colombia
South American Games medalists in cycling